The Chair of the Mazhilis heads the one of the Parliament chambers, the Mäjilis, and is responsible for opening sessions, preside over regular and extraordinary joint meetings. The post was created on 30 January 1996 at the first session opening after the 1995 Kazakh constitutional referendum which was held in 30 August 1995 where majority of Kazakh voters approved of the new constitution which created the a bicameral parliament that included the lower-house Mäjilis.

List of chairs

See also 

 Chair of the Senate of Kazakhstan
 Mazhilis

References 

Kazakhstan